WIND Hellas (formerly TELESTET Hellas and later also TIM Hellas) was a Greek integrated telecommunications provider with headquarters in Athens, Greece. Wind is the third largest mobile operator in Greece (after Cosmote and Vodafone) with more than 4.4 million active subscribers (September 2010). The actual numbers for the years after 2015 are confidential but according to the report of Greek Government for the year 2017, Wind has a share of 15-25% of active subscribers of mobile telephony and 10-15% share of active subscribers of fixed telephony.

On January 11, 2023, WIND Hellas merged with Nova, under the new brand name NOVA Greece, therefore fixed & mobile telephony, internet and other Wind services were rebranded to Nova.

History

Telestet (1992-2004)
In 1992, STET Hellas Telecommunications S.A. was founded, as a subsidiary of the Italian company STET, now Gruppo TIM. Through this, Telestet started its commercial operation. On September 30, 1992 the Greek Ministry of Transport and Communications issued a license to STET to create a national mobile telephony services network (GSM). The company invested the sum of 30 billion Greek drachmas (about 88 million Euros) to create the network. This constituted one of the biggest investments in Greece since the end of the Second World War.

Commercial operation started on June 29, 1993 when the first call from a mobile phone took place in the country.

In 1998 TELESTET was the first Greek mobile telephone communications company to be listed in international stock markets, the Nasdaq in New York City and the Euronext Amsterdam.

From 23 September 1999 TELESTET operated Iridium, the first mobile-telephony dedicated satellite in Greece.

In June 2001, TELESTET was the first telecommunications company in Greece and one of the first in the world to obtain ISO 9001:2000 Quality Management certification.

In June 2001 the operator's GPRS service went live. In July 2001 it was awarded the licence to offer a UMTS service for a concession fee of €146.7 million. The UMTS service went live on January 27, 2004.

TIM Hellas (2004-2007)
On February 8, 2004, the company’s brand name changed to TIM Hellas, the name of the parent company TIM Hellas S.A., a part of Gruppo TIM and member of FreeMove, the biggest telecommunications alliance in Europe that consists of the companies Orange S.A. (UK/France/Switzerland), Telefónica (Spain), ΤΙΜ (Italy) & T-Mobile (Germany).

On April 4, 2005 TIM agreed to sell its 80.87% equity stake in TIM Hellas to funds advised by Apax Partners and TPG Inc. The transaction was for €1,114.1 million which valued TIM Hellas at €1,600 million or €16.43 per share. The transaction was completed following approval by state authorities in July 2005.

On January 31, 2006 WIND Hellas acquired Q-Telecom, Greece’s 4th mobile operator, for €350 million and in May 2007 the two mobile networks were merged.

WIND Hellas (2007-2021)
On February 7, 2007, Apax Partners and TPG announced that TIM Hellas had been purchased outright by Wind Telecom, the telecom holding company of Egyptian tycoon Naguib Sawiris, for 500 million Euros of equity plus 2.9 billion Euros of net debt. The brand name changed to Wind Hellas on June 5, 2007, the name of the parent company Wind Hellas S.A., in line with Italian telecom operator Wind Telecomunicazioni S.p.A.

In December 2009, Nassos Zarkalis, previously head of Hellas Online, became CEO of WIND Hellas.

On October 18, 2010 the principal shareholders in Wind Hellas (Mount Kellett Capital, Taconic Capital Advisers, Providence Equity, Anchorage Capital Group, Angelo Gordon and Eton Park International) took over the company and injected 420 million Euros to reduce debt and fund long-term development plans.

Acquisition by the United Group and merger with NOVA (2021-present)
On August 16, 2021 it was announced that United Group which owns Nova had purchased Wind Hellas for about 1 billion euros after weeks of negotiations with the shareholders of Wind Hellas, and then on January 2, 2023 following a takeover of companies that had Nova and Netmed brands changed its name from Wind Hellas Telecommunications Single Member S.A. to NOVA Telecommunications & Media Single Member S.A., with brand name changed to Nova, starting its commercial activity from January 11.

The crisis and the creditors
The economic recession in Greece caused Wind Hellas severe financial difficulties. Sawiris sold the assets of the holding company (Weather Finance III) to a group of creditors, the SSN Ad Hoc Committee. The group of senior bondholders established a new holding company (Largo Ltd.) which took full control of Wind Hellas in December 2010 and appointed a new board of directors.

Wind Hellas subscriber numbers
Wind issue customers with telephone numbers that begin with either 693 or 690 followed by a seven digit subscriber number. As Wind also own Q-Telecom, they can issue 699 numbers, but these are currently only allocated to new Q-Card customers. Mobile number portability allows customers to port their numbers to and from all Greek networks so Wind customers can also have telephone numbers that were originally allocated to Vodafone or Cosmote.

Vodafone merger talks
In 2011 Vodafone opened talks with the owners of Wind Hellas regarding merging the two firms' operations in Greece, to better challenge market leader COSMOTE. In February 2012 Vodafone pulled out of the talks.

On July 25, 2020 it was announced that Wind Hellas and Vodafone agreed to merge their base stations and antennas into a newly created company called Vantage Towers Greece in which Vodafone would hold a 62% and Wind 38%. This newly company will have 5.200 base stations. This idea comes after Vodafone Group decided to merge all its antennas and base stations that Vodafone is operating in Europe. On March 26, 2021 when Vantage Towers entered the Frankfurt stock exchange Wind Hellas sold its 38% stake to Vantage Towers for 288 million euros. Through the IPO that was launched Wind Hellas bought 100 million euros in shares.

Wind Vision

On 25 April 2018, Wind CEO Nassos Zarkalis introduced the company's Internet Protocol television service called WIND Vision. It was the first Android TV set-top-box in Greece with Netflix integrated. Also, it was the first service offering ultra-high-definition television resolution with HDR 10 technology. The service offered more than 60 channels such as FOX, Disney Channel and National Geographic.

See also
Nova (Greece)
Wind Telecom
Wind (Italy)
Wind Telecom (Dominican Republic)
Telecommunications in Greece
STET – Società Finanziaria Telefonica

References

External links

 (archived website)

Telecommunications companies established in 1992
Internet service providers of Greece
Mobile phone companies of Greece
Greek subsidiaries of foreign companies
Greek companies established in 1992